Simon John Elliott (born 10 June 1974, in Wellington) is a retired New Zealand International footballer who most recently served as head coach of USL Championship side Sacramento Republic FC.

Semi-professional and college career

Elliott played for several clubs in the New Zealand semi-professional Central Premier League in the 1990s, and attended Wellington College prior to moving to the United States. Elliott subsequently played college soccer at Stanford University, where he scored 13 goals and made 12 assists.

Professional career

He began his professional career with A-League (now USL First Division) team Boston Bulldogs in 1999, playing three games, before joining Major League Soccer club Los Angeles Galaxy in May 1999. He was voted Most Valuable Player (MVP) in 2000 after scoring five goals and making five assists, and helped the club to win the CONCACAF Champions' Cup in 2000, the U.S. Open Cup in 2001 and the MLS Cup in 2002. He made 122 appearances for Galaxy in five seasons, scoring ten goals. In 2001, Elliott trained for two months with Manchester United in England, but eventually returned to the United States.

Elliott was traded in January 2004 to the Columbus Crew in exchange for a first round pick in the 2005 MLS SuperDraft. He played every game in the 2005 season but was unable to help the Crew to the MLS Cup Playoffs as they finished bottom of the Eastern Conference.

Elliott caught the eye of Chris Coleman, manager of Premier League club Fulham, during a pre-season friendly game in July 2005 and joined Fulham in training after the end of the MLS season. He then joined Fulham in January 2006 on a free transfer and made 13 league and cup appearances during the remainder of the 2005–06 season. During the summer he injured a calf muscle, and missed the entire Premier League 2006–07 season through injury; he played in some reserve games towards the end of the season. He was released by Fulham in May 2008.

Elliott returned to Major League Soccer in 2009, signing with the San Jose Earthquakes. He was waived from San Jose prior to the 2010 season opener.

In November 2010, Elliott signed for hometown professional A-League club Wellington Phoenix as an Injury Replacement Player for Oscar Roberto Cornejo.

In February 2011, Elliott went on trial with Chivas USA in the MLS and signed with the club on 9 February 2011. At season's end, his contract expired and he entered the 2011 MLS Re-Entry Draft. Elliott was not selected in the draft and became a free agent.

He served as head scout during the 2012 season but was not retained for a second year.

In February 2018, Elliott was hired as head coach for the Sacramento Republic FC. After finishing 7th place in the USL Championship season and getting knocked out in the conference semifinals of the USL Championship Playoffs, Sacramento Republic decided not to extend Elliott contract.

International career

Elliott scored on his full New Zealand national football team debut in a 3–0 win over Singapore on 21 February 1995 and earned his 50th A-international cap in a 3–0 win over New Caledonia on 10 September 2008, accruing 6 goals en route to his milestone. He appeared in qualifying matches for the 2002 FIFA World Cup and in the 2003 FIFA Confederations Cup in France. Elliott was included in the New Zealand U-23 squad for their first appearance at the Olympic Games as one of three over age players, alongside Ryan Nelsen and Chris Killen He was named as part of the 2009 FIFA Confederations Cup New Zealand squad to travel to South Africa.

On 10 May 2010, Elliott was named in New Zealand's final 23-man squad to compete at the 2010 FIFA World Cup, despite not being under contract at any club.

International career statistics

Club career statistics

Club honours
 CONCACAF Champions League: 2000
 MLS Cup: 2002
 MLS Supporters' Shield: 2002
 U.S. Open Cup: 2001

See also
 New Zealand national football team
 New Zealand at the FIFA World Cup
 New Zealand national football team results
 List of New Zealand international footballers

References

External links
 
 NZ Football Profile
 
 

1974 births
Wellington United players
Boston Bulldogs (soccer) players
Chivas USA players
Columbus Crew players
Expatriate footballers in England
Expatriate soccer players in the United States
Footballers at the 2008 Summer Olympics
People educated at Wellington College (New Zealand)
Fulham F.C. players
Living people
LA Galaxy players
New Zealand expatriate association footballers
New Zealand international footballers
New Zealand association footballers
Olympic association footballers of New Zealand
Association footballers from Wellington City
Major League Soccer players
Premier League players
San Jose Earthquakes players
Stanford Cardinal men's soccer players
Miramar Rangers AFC players
Wellington Phoenix FC players
A-League Men players
Wellington Olympic AFC players
Association football midfielders
Sacramento Republic FC coaches
Waterside Karori players
New Zealand expatriate sportspeople in the United States
New Zealand expatriate sportspeople in England
New Zealand association football coaches
1996 OFC Nations Cup players
2000 OFC Nations Cup players
2002 OFC Nations Cup players
2003 FIFA Confederations Cup players
2004 OFC Nations Cup players
2008 OFC Nations Cup players
2009 FIFA Confederations Cup players
2010 FIFA World Cup players